Ramon Moraldo (born July 18, 1951 in Fyzabad) is a retired Trinidad and Tobago football (soccer) defender. He played as a defender.

Awards
 ASL All-Star Team selection - 1979

External links
NASL stats

Living people
American Soccer League (1933–1983) players
California Sunshine players
Association football defenders
Los Angeles Aztecs players
North American Soccer League (1968–1984) players
North American Soccer League (1968–1984) indoor players
Trinidad and Tobago footballers
Trinidad and Tobago expatriate footballers
Trinidad and Tobago international footballers
Expatriate soccer players in the United States
Trinidad and Tobago expatriate sportspeople in the United States
1951 births